Élisabeth Borne (born 18 April 1961) is a French politician who has served as Prime Minister of France since May 2022. She is a member of President Emmanuel Macron's party Renaissance.

A civil engineer, government official and manager of state enterprises in the transport and construction sectors, Borne previously served as minister of transport (2017–2019) and minister of ecology (2019–2020). She was then minister of labour, employment and integration in the Castex government from 2020 to 2022. On 16 May 2022, President Macron appointed her as the next prime minister after Castex's resignation, as it is the tradition following the presidential elections in France. Borne is the second woman to hold the position after Édith Cresson, who served from 1991 to 1992.

Early life and education
Elisabeth Borne was born in Paris. Her French-born mother, Marguerite Lecèsne, was a pharmacist. Her father, Joseph Bornstein, son of Zelig Bornstein from Łuków (formerly Congress Poland), was born in Belgium. He fled to France at the outset of the Second World War and was active in the French Resistance.  Bornstein was one of four brothers.  In 1943, he was arrested by the Gestapo in Grenoble, where he was part of a Jewish resistance movement and deported to Auschwitz concentration camp. His father and younger brother were sent to the gas chambers. Joseph and his older brother were kept alive to work in a synthetic fuel factory.

In April 1945, they met Borne's mother, Marguerite Lescène, at the platform of Paris's Orsay train station where she was helping deportees. She took the brothers to her hometown in Normandy where her family helped them rebuild their lives. Joseph Bornstein later published descriptions of the horrors he had witnessed in the Holocaust. 
He was naturalised in 1950 and changed the family name to "Borne". Borne's mother ran a pharmaceutical laboratory after the war. Her father ran a rubber products factory but suffered from trauma and severe depression. He committed suicide when she was 11 years old. After his death, Borne was awarded  "Ward of the Nation" education benefits which the state granted to minors who were orphaned as a result of the war or had a parent who had died in exceptional circumstances.

Borne attended high school at Lycée Janson-de-Sailly in Paris. Later, she entered the École Polytechnique (class of 1981). In 1986, she obtained her Diplôme d'Ingénieur in civil engineering from the École nationale des ponts et chaussées (National School of Road and Bridge Engineering) and one year later a Master of Business Administration (MBA) from the Collège des Ingénieurs.

Career in the public sector
Borne joined the civil service as a government official at the French planning and works ministry (ministère de l'Equipement) in 1987. In the early 1990s, she was an advisor in the ministry of education under Lionel Jospin and Jack Lang (both members of the Socialist Party). From 1993 to 1996 she worked as a technical director for the public housing company Sonacotra. In 1997, prime minister Jospin appointed her as his advisor for urban planning, housing and transport.

In 2002, Borne became a strategy director and member of the executive committee at the state-owned railway company SNCF, before joining the public works construction company Eiffage as concessions manager in 2007. She worked as director of urban planning for the City of Paris under mayor Bertrand Delanoë from 2008 until 2013.

In 2013 Borne was appointed Prefect of the department Vienne and the region of Poitou-Charentes, the first woman to occupy that position. At that time, Socialist politician Ségolène Royal was president of the regional council of Poitou-Charentes. When Royal became Minister of Ecology, Sustainable Development and Energy in 2014, she appointed Borne as her chief of staff (directrice de cabinet). Borne subsequently was the President and CEO of RATP Group, a state-owned enterprise which operates public transport in Greater Paris, from 2015 to 2017.

Political career
For a long time Borne was close to the Socialist Party (PS), but without formally joining the party. After Emmanuel Macron's victory in the 2017 French presidential election, she joined La République En Marche! (LREM).

Borne served as minister-delegate of transport in the first and second Philippe governments from May 2017 to July 2019. During her time in office, she held out against weeks of strikes and demonstrations in 2017 to end a generous pension and benefits system for SNCF railway workers. After the resignation of ecology minister François de Rugy in 2019, Borne was promoted to head the ministry of the ecological and inclusive transition. In that capacity, she led efforts to pass a long-term energy planning bill aimed at increasing security of supply and a clean mobility bill committing the country to reaching carbon neutrality in the transport sector by 2050.

In 2019, Borne opposed France's ratification of the European Union–Mercosur free trade agreement.

Since 2020 Borne has additionally been a member of Territories of Progress, a centre-left party allied with LREM. In September 2022, both parties merged into the Renaissance party.

Minister of Labour, 2020–2022
In July 2020, Borne was appointed minister of labour, employment and economic inclusion in the government of prime minister Jean Castex, succeeding Muriel Pénicaud. In that capacity, she oversaw negotiations with unions that resulted in a cut to unemployment benefits for some job seekers. During her time in office, France's unemployment rate fell to its lowest level in 15 years and youth unemployment to its lowest level in 40 years.

Prime Minister, 2022–present
On 16 May 2022, Borne was appointed Prime Minister of France, succeeding Castex three weeks after the re-election of Macron for a second term as President of the French Republic. After Édith Cresson in 1991–1992, she is the second woman only to hold the position. She is also the second of Macron's prime ministers to be a member of his centrist party, after Castex.

Borne was a candidate for Renaissance (formerly known as La République En Marche!) in the 2022 French legislative election in Calvados's 6th constituency in the Normandy region in northwestern France. While remaining a candidate, under the dual mandate (cumuls des mandats) law she was not allowed to take up the position after she won the election, and was replaced by her designated alternate. She called on voters to support Macron's coalition, Ensemble Citoyens, saying it is the only group "capable of getting [a parliamentary] majority". After the first round, in relation to contests between left-wing and far-right candidates, she said: "Our position is no voice for the RN." At the same time, she expressed support only for left-wing candidates who in her view respect republican values. She was elected to Parliament in the second round. Borne offered her resignation as prime minister after the results of the second round, but was rejected by Macron, who instead tasked her to form a new cabinet.

Following a cabinet reshuffle prompted by the 2022 legislative elections, Borne comfortably survived a motion of no-confidence brought against her by MPs of the New Ecologic and Social People's Union (NUPES), a broad alliance of left-wing opponents.

Personal life 
Borne was admitted to hospital with COVID-19 in March 2021 and was administered oxygen.

Borne married Olivier Allix, a lecturer and also an engineer, on 30 June 1989 with whom she later had a son, Nathan. The couple has since divorced.

Honours

See also
 Borne government

References

External links
Élisabeth Borne on Gouvernement.fr

|-

|-

|-

1961 births
Living people
21st-century French women politicians
Chevaliers of the Légion d'honneur
Corps des ponts
École des Ponts ParisTech alumni
École Polytechnique alumni
French chief executives
French Ministers of Labour and Social Affairs
French politicians
French women
French people of Polish-Jewish descent
Officers of the Ordre national du Mérite
Politicians from Paris
Prime Ministers of France
Transport ministers of France
Women government ministers of France
Women prime ministers
Prefects of Vienne
La République En Marche! politicians
Deputies of the 16th National Assembly of the French Fifth Republic
Members of the Borne government